On 28 October 2019, Islamists shot 16 civilians dead in Pobe Mengao, Burkina Faso after they refused to help the gunmen buy weapons.

During the incident, the rebels looted shops, stealing several vehicles from store owners. it was part of a broader campaign by Islamist rebels in the country.

References 

2019 mass shootings in Africa
2019 murders in Burkina Faso
21st-century mass murder in Burkina Faso
Mass shootings in Burkina Faso
October 2019 crimes in Africa
Terrorist incidents in Burkina Faso in 2019
Jihadist insurgency in Burkina Faso